Yangon BRT is a bus rapid transit in Yangon, Myanmar, run by joint public-private venture Yangon Bus Public Company Limited (ရန်ကုန်ဘတ်စကား အများနှင့်သက်ဆိုင်သော ကုမ္ပဏီလီမိတက်).  It was launched on 7 February 2016, with two circular routes.  A prepaid card called Any Pay is available for payment as well as cash. The BRT Lite charges a flat rate of 300 kyats per ride (around US$0.24). The current hours of operation is from 6a.m. to 7:30p.m.

Fleet 
The YPBC operates a fleet of 65 buses serving in the Downtown Yangon (Myanmar) Area:
 15 King Long XM6119G
 15 Higer city-buses
 15 Daewoo city-buses
 15 Hyundai city-buses
 5 Scania Marcopolo
As with any other buses serving in the city, the company name and logo is at the top of the front-end of the bus. The route number is indicated below the company logo. Names of bus-stops served are also shown at the bottom of the windscreen.

The Yangon Bus Public Company is the only bus transit company in Myanmar that operates with an all air-conditioned fleet of buses.

YBPC BRT Lite Line 1

See also
 Yangon Tram

References

Road transport in Myanmar
Transport in Yangon